XHEPR-FM (99.1 MHz) is a Mexican radio station in Ciudad Juárez, Chihuahua, Mexico. It is owned by Grupo Radiorama. XHEPR-FM's transmitter is located south of Ciudad Juárez in the Sierra Presidio mountain range.

History

XHEPR's concession was awarded to Javier Moreno Valle, a Mexican businessman and founder of Mexico City television station XHTVM-TV, on September 30, 1994.

In 2000, Moreno Valle, facing difficulty with a dispute over the Mexico City station, sold the station to Radio Integral, S.A. de C.V. (Grupo ACIR), which had already been operating the station as grupera "La Comadre". That year, in partnership with US company Clear Channel Communications, which at the time owned 40% of ACIR, XHEPR became "99.1 The Bandit", playing classic rock in English. It later became classic hits-formatted "The Eagle 99.1".

Eventually, ACIR sold XHEPR to Grupo Radiorama (with operation handled by Grupo Radio México), though the concession remained in the name of Radio Integral until late 2015. The station was initially known as "Pancho 99.1" under GRM management, later changing its name to "Radio Centro 99.1".

In 2015, XHEPR took on the Planeta Spanish CHR format from 103.5 as part of a reorganization of GRM stations in Juárez. On May 8, 2018, GRM and Radiorama swapped the frequencies of their pop stations in Juárez, with Planeta moving from 99.1 to XHIM-FM 105.1 and @FM moving from 105.1 to 99.1.

On May 8, 2019, XHEPR flipped to grupera, branded as "Madre 99.1". On June 15, Madre moved to 105.1 and Planeta returned to the 99.1 frequency. Within a month, however, XHEPR dropped Planeta and became Estéreo Vida. That format lasted less than a year, as the station flipped to Studio 99.1, mirroring the 1980s- and 1990s-focused classic hits format installed on XHFI-FM in Chihuahua, on July 1, 2020.

XHEPR and XHIM swapped formats again for the third time in four years in 2021, returning Madre to the 99.1 frequency.

On September 2, 2021, Grupo Radio Centro, returns to operation the station became as Alfa with CHR format.

On April 1, 2022, changes the formats again with XHFAMA-FM in Ciudad Camargo, changing Alfa to the current name as Máxima.

References

Radio stations in Chihuahua
Radio stations established in 1994
Mass media in Ciudad Juárez
1994 establishments in Mexico